Max Theodor Felix von Laue (9 October 1879 – 24 April 1960) was a German physicist who received the Nobel Prize in Physics in 1914 for his discovery of the diffraction of X-rays by crystals.

In addition to his scientific endeavors with contributions in optics, crystallography, quantum theory, superconductivity, and the theory of relativity, Laue had a number of administrative positions which advanced and guided German scientific research and development during four decades. A strong objector to  Nazism, he was instrumental in re-establishing and organizing German science after World War II.

Biography

Early years
Laue was born in Pfaffendorf, now part of Koblenz, Germany, to Julius Laue and Minna Zerrenner. In 1898, after passing his Abitur in Strassburg, he began his compulsory year of military service, after which in 1899 he started to study mathematics, physics, and chemistry at the University of Strassburg, the University of Göttingen, and the Ludwig Maximilian University of Munich (LMU). At Göttingen, he was greatly influenced by the physicists Woldemar Voigt and Max Abraham and the mathematician David Hilbert. After only one semester at Munich, he went to the Friedrich-Wilhelms-University of Berlin in 1902. There, he studied under Max Planck, who gave birth to the quantum theory revolution on 14 December 1900, when he delivered his famous paper before the Deutsche Physikalische Gesellschaft. At Berlin, Laue attended lectures by Otto Lummer on heat radiation and interference spectroscopy, the influence of which can be seen in Laue's dissertation on interference phenomena in plane-parallel plates, for which he received his doctorate in 1903. Thereafter, Laue spent 1903 to 1905 at Göttingen. Laue completed his Habilitation  in 1906 under Arnold Sommerfeld at LMU.

Career
He was a Privatdozent in Berlin and an assistant to Planck. He also met Albert Einstein for the first time; their friendship contributed to the acceptance and development of Einstein's theory of relativity. Laue continued as assistant to Planck until 1909. In Berlin, he worked on the application of entropy to radiation fields and on the thermodynamic significance of the coherence of light waves.

From 1909 to 1912, Laue was a Privatdozent at the Institute for Theoretical Physics, under Arnold Sommerfeld, at LMU. During the 1911 Christmas recess and in January 1912, Paul Peter Ewald was finishing the writing of his doctoral thesis under Sommerfeld. It was on a walk through the Englischer Garten in Munich in January, that Ewald told Laue about his thesis topic. The wavelengths of concern to Ewald were in the visible region of the spectrum and hence much larger than the spacing between the resonators in Ewald's crystal model. Laue seemed distracted and wanted to know what would be the effect if much smaller wavelengths were considered. In June, Sommerfeld reported to the Physikalische Gesellschaft of Göttingen on the successful diffraction of X-rays by Laue, Paul Knipping and Walter Friedrich at LMU, for which Laue would be awarded the Nobel Prize in Physics, in 1914. While at Munich, he wrote the first volume of his book on relativity during the period 1910 to 1911.

In 1912, Laue was called to the University of Zurich as an extraordinarius professor of physics. Upon his father's elevation to the ranks of hereditary nobility in 1913, he became 'Max von Laue'. A new professor extraordinarius chair of theoretical physics had been created in 1914 at the University of Berlin. He was offered the position but turned it down, and it was offered to Max Born. But Born was in the army until WW I ended, and before he had occupied the chair, Laue changed his mind and accepted the position.

From 1914 to 1919, Laue was at the University of Frankfurt as ordinarius professor of theoretical physics. He was engaged in vacuum tube development, at the University of Würzburg, for use in military telephony and wireless communications from 1916.

He was called to the University of Berlin as ordinarius professor of theoretical physics, a position he held from 1919 until 1943, when he was declared emeritus, with his consent and one year before the mandatory retirement age. At the university in 1919, other notables were Walther Nernst, Fritz Haber, and James Franck. Laue, as one of the organizers of the weekly Berlin Physics Colloquium, typically sat in the front row with Nernst and Einstein, who would come over from the Kaiser-Wilhelm-Institut für Physik in Berlin-Dahlem, where he was the director. Among Laue's notable students at the university were Leó Szilárd, Fritz London, Max Kohler, and Erna Weber.  He published the second volume of his book on relativity in 1921.

As a consultant to the Physikalisch-Technische Reichsanstalt (PTR), Laue met Walther Meissner who was working there on superconductivity. Meissner had discovered that a weak magnetic field decays rapidly to zero in the interior of a superconductor, which is known as the Meissner effect. Laue showed, in 1932, that the threshold of the applied magnetic field which destroys superconductivity varies with the shape of the body. He published a total of 12 papers and a book on superconductivity. One of the papers was co-authored with brothers Fritz and Heinz London. Meissner published a biography on Laue in 1960.

The Kaiser-Wilhelm Gesellschaft zur Förderung der Wissenschaften (Today: Max-Planck Gesellschaft zur Förderung der Wissenschaften) was founded in 1911. Its purpose was to promote the sciences by founding and maintaining research institutes. One such institute was the Kaiser-Wilhelm Institut für Physik (KWIP) founded in Berlin-Dahlem in 1914, with Einstein as director. Laue was a trustee of the institute from 1917, and in 1922 he was appointed deputy director, whereupon he took over the administrative duties from Einstein. Einstein was traveling abroad when Adolf Hitler became Chancellor in January 1933, and Einstein did not return to Germany. Laue then became acting director of the KWIP, a position he held until 1946 or 1948, except for the period 1935 to 1939, when Peter Debye was director. In 1943, to avoid casualties to the personnel, the KWIP moved to Hechingen. It was at Hechingen that Laue wrote his book on the history of physics Geschichte der Physik, which was eventually translated into seven other languages.

Opposition to Nazism 
Laue opposed Nazism in general and Deutsche Physik in particular – the former persecuted the Jews, in general, and the latter, among other things, put down Einstein's theory of relativity as Jewish physics, which Laue saw as ridiculous: "science has no race or religion". Laue and his close friend Otto Hahn secretly helped scientific colleagues persecuted by Nazi policies to emigrate from Germany. Laue also openly opposed Nazi policies. An address on 18 September 1933 at the opening of the physics convention in Würzburg, opposition to Johannes Stark, an obituary note on Fritz Haber in 1934, and attendance at a commemoration for Haber are examples which clearly illustrate Laue's courageous, open opposition:
Laue, as chairman of the Deutsche Physikalische Gesellschaft, gave the opening address at the 1933 physics convention. In it, he compared the persecution of Galileo and the oppression of his scientific views on the solar theory of Copernicus to the then conflict and persecution over the theory of relativity by the proponents of Deutsche Physik, against the work of Einstein, labeled "Jewish physics."
Johannes Stark, who had received the Nobel Prize in Physics in 1919, wished to become the Führer of German physics and was a proponent of Deutsche Physik. Against the unanimous advice of those consulted, Stark was appointed President of the PTR in May 1933. However, Laue successfully blocked Stark's regular membership in the Prussian Academy of Sciences.
Haber received the Nobel Prize in Chemistry in 1918.  In spite of this and his many other contributions to Germany, he was forced to emigrate from Germany as a result of the Law for the Restoration of the Professional Civil Service, which removed Jews from their jobs. Laue's obituary note praising Haber and comparing his forced emigration to the expulsion of Themistocles from Athens was a direct affront to the policies of National Socialism.
In connection with Haber, Max Planck, Otto Hahn and Laue organized a commemoration event held in Berlin-Dahlem on 29 January 1935, the first anniversary of Haber's death – attendance at the event by professors in the civil service had been expressly forbidden by the government. While many scientific and technical personnel were represented at the memorial by their wives, Laue and Wolfgang Heubner were the only two professors to attend.  This was yet another blatant demonstration of Laue's opposition to National Socialism. The date of the first anniversary of Haber's death was also one day before the second anniversary of National Socialism seizing power in Germany, thus further increasing the affront given by holding the event.

The speech and the obituary note earned Laue government reprimands. Furthermore, in response to Laue blocking Stark's regular membership in the Prussian Academy of Sciences, Stark, in December 1933, had Laue sacked from his position as advisor to the PTR, which Laue had held since 1925. Chapters 4 and 5, in Welker's Nazi Science: Myth, Truth, and the Atomic Bomb, present a more detailed account of the struggle by Laue and Planck against the Nazi takeover of the Prussian Academy of Sciences.

In a commonly reported anecdote Laue is supposed to have carried parcels in his hands when exiting his house, so to avoid having to give the Nazi Salute

Hidden Nobel prize 
When Nazi Germany invaded Denmark in World War II, the Hungarian chemist George de Hevesy dissolved the Nobel Prize gold medals of Laue and James Franck in aqua regia to prevent the Nazis from discovering them. At the time, it was illegal to take gold out of the country, and if it had been discovered that Laue had done so he could have faced prosecution in Germany. Hevesy placed the resulting solution on a shelf in his laboratory at the Niels Bohr Institute. After the war, he returned to find the solution undisturbed and precipitated the gold out of the acid. The Nobel Society then re-cast the Nobel Prize gold medals, using the original gold.

Post-war 
On 23 April 1945, French troops entered Hechingen, followed the next day by a contingent of Operation Alsos – an operation to investigate the German nuclear energy effort, seize equipment, and prevent German scientists from being captured by the Soviets. The scientific advisor to the Operation was the Dutch-American physicist Samuel Goudsmit, who, adorned with a steel helmet, appeared at Laue's home. Laue was taken into custody and taken to Huntingdon, England, and interned at Farm Hall with other scientists thought to be involved in nuclear research and development.

While incarcerated, Laue was a reminder to the other detainees that one could survive the Nazi reign without having "compromised"; this alienated him from others being detained. During his incarceration, Laue wrote a paper on the absorption of X-rays under the interference conditions, and it was later published in Acta Crystallographica.  On 2 October 1945, Laue, Otto Hahn, and Werner Heisenberg, were taken to meet with Henry Hallett Dale, president of the Royal Society, and other members of the Society. There, Laue was invited to attend 9 November 1945 Royal Society meeting in memory of the German physicist Wilhelm Conrad Röntgen, who discovered X-rays; permission was, however, not forthcoming from the military authorities detaining von Laue.

Laue was returned to Germany early in 1946. He went back to being acting director of the KWIP, which had been moved to Göttingen. It was also in 1946 that the Kaiser-Wilhelm Gesellschaft was renamed the Max-Planck Gesellschaft, and, likewise, the Kaiser-Wilhelm Institut für Physik became the Max-Planck Institut für Physik. Laue also became an adjunct professor at the University of Göttingen. In addition to his administrative and teaching responsibilities, Laue wrote his book on superconductivity, Theorie der Supraleitung, and revised his books on electron diffraction, Materiewellen und ihre Interferenzen, and the first volume of his two-volume book on relativity.

In July 1946, Laue went back to England, only four months after having been interned there, to attend an international conference on crystallography. This was a distinct honor, as he was the only German invited to attend. He was extended many courtesies by the British officer who escorted him there and back, and a well-known English crystallographer as his host; Laue was even allowed to wander around London on his own free will.

After the war, there was much to be done in re-establishing and organizing German scientific endeavors. Laue participated in some key roles. In 1946, he initiated the founding of the Deutsche Physikalische Gesellschaft in only the British Occupation Zone, as the Allied Control Council would not initially allow organizations across occupation zone boundaries. During the war, the PTR had been dispersed; von Laue, from 1946 to 1948, worked on its re-unification across three zones and its location at new facilities in Braunschweig. Additionally, it took on a new name as the Physikalisch-Technische Bundesanstalt, but administration was not taken over by Germany until after the formation of West Germany on 23 May 1949. Circa 1948, the President of the American Physical Society asked Laue to report on the status of physics in Germany; his report was published in 1949 in the American Journal of Physics. In 1950, Laue participated in the creation of the Verband Deutscher Physikalischer Gesellschaften, formerly affiliated under the Nordwestdeutsche Physikalische Gesellschaft.

In April 1951, Laue became director of the Max-Planck Institut für physikalische Chemie und Elektrochemie, a position he held until 1959. In 1953, at the request of Laue, the Institute was renamed the Fritz Haber Institut für physikalische Chemie und Elektrochemie der Max-Planck Gesellschaft.

Personal life

It was in 1913 that Laue's father, Julius Laue, a civil servant in the military administration, was raised into the ranks of hereditary nobility. Thus Max Laue became Max von Laue. Laue married Magdalene Degen, while he was a Privatdozent at LMU. They had two children. Their son, Theodor Hermann von Laue (1916–2000), went to the United States in 1937, and received his B.A. and Ph.D. from Princeton University. After his service in the U.S. Army, Theodor taught modern history as a professor at various U.S. universities.

Among Laue's chief recreational activities were mountaineering, motoring in his automobile, motor-biking, sailing, and skiing. While not a mountain climber, he did enjoy hiking on the Alpine glaciers with his friends.

On 8 April 1960, while he was driving to his laboratory, Laue's car was struck in Berlin by a motorcyclist, who had received his license only two days earlier. The motorcyclist was killed and Laue's car was overturned. He died from his injuries sixteen days later on 24 April. Being a profound believer, he had asked that his epitaph should read that he had died trusting firmly in God's mercy.

Organizations
 1919: Corresponding member of the Prussian Academy of Sciences
 1921: Regular member of the Prussian Academy of Sciences
 From 1921: Chairman of the physics commission of the Notgemeinschaft der Deutschen Wissenschaft (Renamed in 1937: Deutsche Gemeinschaft zur Erhaltung und Förderun der Forschung. No longer active by 1945.)
 From 1922: Member of the Board of Trustees of the Potsdam Astrophysics Observatory
 1925 – 1933: Advisor to the Physikalisch-Technische Reichsanstalt (Today: Physikalisch-Technische Bundesanstalt). Laue had been sacked in 1933 from his advisory position by Johannes Stark, Nobel Prize recipient and President of the Physikalisch-Technische Reichsanstalt, in retribution for Laue's open opposition to the Nazis by blocking Stark's regular membership in the Prussian Academy of Sciences.
 1931 – 1933: : Chairman of the Deutsche Physikalische Gesellschaft
 Memberships in the Russian Academy of Sciences, the Kant Society, the Austrian Academy of Sciences (1960), the American Physical Society, the Société Française de Physique, the Société Française de Mineralogie et Crystallographie, the American Academy of Arts and Sciences, the American Philosophical Society, and the United States National Academy of Sciences.
 Corresponding Member of the Academies of Sciences of Göttingen, Munich, Turin, Stockholm, Rome (Papal), Madrid, the Accademia dei Lincei of Rome, and the Royal Society of London.

Honours and awards
1914: Nobel Prize for Physics
1932: Max-Planck Medal of the Deutsche Physikalische Gesellschaft
1952: Knight of the Order Pour le Mérite
1953: Grand Cross with Star for Federal Services
1957: Officer of the Legion of Honour of France
1959: Helmholtz Medal of the East-Berlin Academy of Sciences
Landenburg Medal
Bimala–Churn–Law Gold Medal of the Indian Association at Calcutta

Selected bibliography

Max von Laue Die Relativitätstheorie. Band 1: Die spezielle Relativitätstheorie (Friedr. Vieweg & Sohn, Braunschweig, 1911, and 1919)
Max von Laue Das Relativitätstheorie. Erster Band. Das Relativitätsprinzip der Lorentz-transformation. Vierte vermehrte Auflage. (Friedr. Vieweg & Sohn, 1921)
Max von Laue Die Relativitätstheorie. Zweiter Band : Die Allgemeine Relativitätstheorie Und Einsteins Lehre Von Der Schwerkraft  (Friedr. Vieweg & Sohn, Braunschweig, 1921 and 1923)
Max von Laue Korpuskular- und Wellentheorie (Leipzig, 1933)
Max von Laue Die Interferenzen von Röntgen- und Elektronenstrahlen. Fünf Vorträge. (Springer, 1935)
Max von Laue Eine Ausgestaltung der Londonschen Theorie der Supraleitung (Barth, 1942)
Max von Laue Materiewellen und ihre Interferenzen (Akadem. Verl.-Ges. Becker & Erler, 1944) (Geest und Portig, 1948)
Max von Laue Theorie der Supraleitung (Springer, 1947 and 1949)
Max von Laue, translated by Lothar Meyer and William Band Theory of Superconductivity (N.Y., 1952)
Max von Laue Geschichte der Physik (Univ.-Verl., 1946 and 1947), (Athenäum-Verl., 1950) and (Ullstein Taschenbücher-Verl., 1959, 1966 and 1982) [This book was translated into seven other languages.]
Max von Laue, translated by Ralph E. Oesper History of Physics (Academic Press, 1950)
Max von Laue Histoire De La Physique (Lamarre, 1953)
Max von Laue Geschiedenis der natuurkunde ('s Gravenhage, Stols, 1950 and 1954)
Max Planck and Max von Laue Wissenschaftliche Selbstbiographie (Barth, 1948)
Max von Laue Röntgenstrahlinterferenzen (Akadem. Verl.-Ges., 1948)
Max von Laue Die Relativitätstheorie. Bd. 2. Die allgemeine Relativitätstheorie (Vieweg, 1953)
Max Planck and Max von Laue Vorlesungen über Thermodynamik de Gruyter (Gebundene, 1954)
Walter Friedrich, Paul Knipping, and Max von Laue Interferenzerscheinungen bei Röntgenstrahlen (J. A. Barth, 1955)
Max von Laue Die Relativitätstheorie. Bd. 1. Die spezielle Relativitätstheorie (Vieweg, 1955)
Max von Laue Die Relativitätstheorie. Bd. 2. Die allgemeine Relativitätstheorie (Vieweg, 1956)
Max von Laue Max von Laue
Max von Laue Röntgenwellenfelder in Kristallen (Akademie-Verl., 1959)
Max von Laue Von Laue-Festschrift. 1 (Akadem. Verl.-Ges., 1959)
Max von Laue Von Laue-Festschrift. 2 (Akadem. Verl.-Ges., 1960)
Max von Laue and Ernst Heinz Wagner Röntgenstrahl-Interferenzen (Akadem. Verl.-Ges., 1960)
Max von Laue and Friedrich Beck Die Relativitätstheorie. Bd. 1. Die spezielle Relativitätstheorie (Vieweg, 1961 and 1965)
Max von Laue Gesammelte Schriften und Vorträge. Bd. 1 (Vieweg, 1961)
Max von Laue Gesammelte Schriften und Vorträge. Bd. 2 (Vieweg, 1961)
Max von Laue Gesammelte Schriften und Vorträge. Bd. 3 (Vieweg, 1961)
Max von Laue Aufsätze und Vorträge (Vieweg, 1961 and 1962)
Max von Laue and Friedrich Beck Die Relativitätstheorie. Bd. 2. Die allgemeine Relativitätstheorie (Vieweg, 1965)
Max von Laue Die Relativitätstheorie II. Die allgemeine Relativitätstheorie  (Vieweg Friedr. und Sohn Ver, 1982)

Other publications
  Received 1 April 1913, published in issue No. 10 of 15 May 1913. As cited in Mehra, Volume 5, Part 2, 2001, p. 922.
  Received 1 October 1913, published in issue No. 21 of 1 November 1913. As cited in Mehra, Volume 5, Part 2, 2001, p. 922.
 Presented on 24 September 1913 at the 85th Naturforscherversammlung, Vienna, published in issue No. 22/23 of 15 November 1913. As cited in Mehra, Volume 5, Part 2, 2001, p. 922.
 Received 21 November 1913, published in issue No. 25 of 15 December 1913. As cited in Mehra, Volume 5, Part 2, 2001, p. 922.

See also
History of special relativity
Laue equations
Sagnac effect
Trouton–Noble experiment
Twin paradox
Einstein synchronisation
Institut Laue–Langevin
Laue (crater)
10762 von Laue

References

Sources

Further reading

External links

Max von Laue Biography – Deutsches Historisches Museum Berlin 
 – University of Frankfurt on Main 
  including the Nobel Lecture, 3 June 1920 Concerning the Detection of X-ray Interferences
Nobel Presentation Address – An account of Laue's work is by Professor G. Granqvist, Chairman of the Nobel Committee for Physics

1879 births
1960 deaths
20th-century German physicists
Scientists from Koblenz
Experimental physicists
Optical physicists
Members of the Pontifical Academy of Sciences
Nobel laureates in Physics
German Nobel laureates
People from the Rhine Province
Recipients of the Pour le Mérite (civil class)
University of Strasbourg alumni
University of Göttingen alumni
Ludwig Maximilian University of Munich alumni
Academic staff of the Ludwig Maximilian University of Munich
Humboldt University of Berlin alumni
Academic staff of the Humboldt University of Berlin
People associated with the University of Zurich
Academic staff of Goethe University Frankfurt
Members of the Prussian Academy of Sciences
Institute for Advanced Study visiting scholars
Corresponding Members of the Russian Academy of Sciences (1917–1925)
Corresponding Members of the USSR Academy of Sciences
Honorary Members of the USSR Academy of Sciences
Foreign Members of the USSR Academy of Sciences
Crystallographers
Foreign Members of the Royal Society
Road incident deaths in Germany
Winners of the Max Planck Medal
Scientists from Frankfurt
Knights Commander of the Order of Merit of the Federal Republic of Germany
Operation Epsilon
Members of the German Academy of Sciences at Berlin
Foreign associates of the National Academy of Sciences
Recipients of the Matteucci Medal
German Christians
Max Planck Institute directors
Fellows of the American Physical Society